Luis Ángel Duque Mata (born 31 October 1953) is a Spanish football manager.

Managerial career
Born in Madrid, Duque began his managerial career with CD Leganés' youth setup, being promoted to the main squad in 1989. After taking the club to Segunda División and narrowly avoiding relegation in the 1994–95 campaign, he was appointed Getafe CF manager in December 1995.

Duque subsequently suffered relegation with Geta in June of the following year, and was relieved from his in May 1997, with the side already out of the promotion zones. In 1999, he was appointed at the helm of Real Ávila CF, and subsequently managed SD Compostela and Cultural y Deportiva Leonesa, all in Segunda División B.

On 2 February 2004, Duque was named UD Almería manager. He was sacked on 5 April, with the club nearing the relegation zones.

In the 2005 summer Duque returned to his first club Leganés, managing the side during the most of the 2005–06 campaign. He was later the club's sports director, eventually returning as manager in July 2009.

On 22 March 2010, Duque stepped down as manager, returning to his previous position. He left Lega in the end of the season.

References

External links

1953 births
Living people
Footballers from Madrid
Spanish football managers
Segunda División managers
CD Leganés managers
Getafe CF managers
SD Compostela managers
Cultural Leonesa managers
UD Almería managers
Cartagena FC players
Association footballers not categorized by position
Spanish footballers